Segniliparus is a genus of Actinomycetota.

References

Mycobacteriales
Bacteria genera